The 2017 Stanford Cardinal football team represented Stanford University in the 2017 NCAA Division I FBS football season. The Cardinal were led by seventh-year head coach David Shaw. They played their home games at Stanford Stadium and were members of the North Division of the Pac-12 Conference. They finished the season 9–5, 7–2 in Pac-12 play to win a share of the North Division title with Washington. Due to their head-to-head win over Washington, they represented the North Division in the Pac-12 Championship Game where they lost to USC. They were invited to the Alamo Bowl where they lost to TCU.

Previous season

In 2016, the Cardinal finished the season by defeating North Carolina 25–23 in the Sun Bowl.

Recruiting

Position key

Recruits

Stanford signed a total of 14 recruits.

Personnel

Coaching staff

Roster

Schedule

Game summaries

vs. Rice

at No. 6 USC

at San Diego State

UCLA

Arizona State

at No. 20 Utah

Oregon

at Oregon State

at No. 25 Washington State

No. 9 Washington

California

Notre Dame

vs. USC (Pac-12 Championship Game)

vs. TCU (Alamo Bowl)

Rankings

Players drafted into the NFL

References

Stanford
Stanford Cardinal football seasons
Stanford Cardinal football